Myrsine howittiana, the  brush muttonwood  or muttonwood, is a shrub or small tree in the family Primulaceae. The species is endemic to eastern Australia.

It grows to between 3 and 10 metres in height and has smooth, often whitish, bark. The buds of new growth are covered with rusty-coloured hairs. The leaves are obovate to elliptic in shape and between 4 and 13 cm long and 2 to 4 cm wide. These are shiny with wavy edges and a duller undersurface and have petioles that are 7 to 14 mm in length.  Greenish-white to cream flowers are produced in spring and summer. These are followed by blue or mauve fruits which are 5 to 7 mm in diameter and ripen between December and June.

The species is pollinated by a thrips (thunderfly), Thrips setipennis.
The species occurs from southern Victoria (37° S), northwards through New South Wales to Fraser Island (25° S) in Queensland often in areas where rainforest interfaces with moist open forest.

References

howittiana
Flora of New South Wales
Flora of Queensland
Flora of Victoria (Australia)
Ericales of Australia
Trees of Australia
Taxa named by Ferdinand von Mueller
Taxa named by Carl Christian Mez
Taxa named by Betsy Rivers Jackes